Momi may refer to:

People 
 Hilaire Momi (born 1990), Central African footballer
 Momi Zafran (born 1956), Israeli  football coach
 Raaginder (born 1992), Thai Indian musician

Places 
 Museum of the Moving Image, a museum in New York
 Museum of the Moving Image (London), a museum in London
 Pali Momi Medical Center, a nonprofit hospital located in West O‘ahu, Hawai‘i
 Momi cafe, a coffee house in Pingjiang Road, Suzhou, China

Other uses 
 Abies firma, the momi fir, a species of fir native to central and southern Japan
 Momi (ship), several Japanese ships